Marco Antonio Flores (1937 – July 26, 2013) was a Guatemalan author, poet, essayist, journalist and professor. His published works include the collections of poetry La voz acumulada (1964), Muros de luz (1968), La derrota (1972), Persistencia de la memoria (1992), Crónica de los años de fuego (1993), Un ciego fuego en el alma (1995), Reunión, Poesía completa, Volumen I (1992)
and Volumen II (2000) as well as Poesía escogida (1998). His novels include Los compañeros (1976), En el filo (1993), Los muchachos de antes (1996), Las batallas perdidas (1999), La siguamonta (1993) and Cuentos completos (1999).

References

1937 births
2013 deaths
20th-century Guatemalan poets
20th-century male writers
Guatemalan male poets
Guatemalan novelists
Male novelists
Guatemalan male short story writers
Guatemalan short story writers
20th-century novelists
20th-century short story writers